James Rowland Eubank (December 8, 1914 – November 9, 1952) was a lawyer from Alexandria, Louisiana, who served for six months during 1952 in the Louisiana House of Representatives for Rapides Parish. He died in office at the age of thirty-seven from a heart attack.

Eubank was a floor leader for Governor Robert F. Kennon.

Eubank served in the United States Army during World War II. He is interred alongside his parents at Greenwood Memorial Park in Pineville, Louisiana.

References

1914 births
1952 deaths
Lee family of Virginia
Democratic Party members of the Louisiana House of Representatives
Politicians from Alexandria, Louisiana
Louisiana State University Law Center alumni
Louisiana lawyers
United States Army soldiers
United States Army personnel of World War II
20th-century American lawyers
Burials in Louisiana
20th-century American politicians